Trichodes alvearius is a species of soldier or checkered beetle belonging to the family Cleridae, subfamily Clerinae.

Description 
Trichodes alvearius is a very hairy beetle with black head and scutellum. The elongated elytra show a bright red colour with black bands. This species can easily be distinguished from Trichodes apiarius by the black stripe down the middle of the back (along the inner edge of the elytra) and the red apex, not reached by the black terminal stain. It does not fly readily, relying instead on its warning coloration to protect itself from predators.

Distribution 
These beetles are widely distributed across southern Europe in Albania, Czech Republic, Italy, Greece, France, Germany, Hungary, Poland, Spain, Switzerland, the western half of the Balkans, and in North Africa. The species became extinct in England in the nineteenth century.

Life cycle 
At the larval stage they are parasites of several species of bees and wasps, as the adults lay the eggs close hymenopteran nests or hives (hence the name “alvearius”, the bee-hive beetle), eating various stages of their victims.

The adults can be encountered from May through August on the flowers, mainly Apiaceae, Asteraceae and Crataegus species, feeding on pollen. However, they integrate their diet with small insects that they actively hunt, especially Oedemera, Psilothrix,  Stenopterus and Clytus species.

Notes

External links 
 Biolib
  Fauna europaea

alvearius
Beetles of Europe
Beetles described in 1792